PMHC cellular microarrays are a type of cellular microarray that has been spotted with pMHC complexes peptide-MHC class I or peptide-MHC class II.

These biochips can be used to interrogate immune cells, particularly antigen-specific T cells, from clinical samples for what they are capable of
recognizing.  They can also be co-spotted with other molecules, such as antibodies that capture cytokines, allowing for high-throughput functional
analysis of the captured T cells.  Molecules spotted on a pMHC cellular microarray can be classified as capture molecules, detector molecules and effector
molecules.

They were developed by Daniel Chen, Yoav Soen, Dan Kraft, Pat Brown and Mark Davis
at Stanford University Medical Center.

References

Chen DS, Davis MM (2006) Molecular and functional analysis using live cell microarrays. Curr Opin Chem Biol 10:28-34

Chen DS, Soen Y, Stuge TB, Lee PP, Weber JS, Brown PO, Davis MM (2005) Marked Differences in Human Melanoma Antigen-Specific T Cell Responsiveness after Vaccination Using a Functional Microarray. PLoS Med 2: 10: e265 
 
Soen Y., Chen D. S., Kraft D. L., Davis M. M. and Brown P.O. (2003) Detection and characterization of cellular immune responses using peptide-MHC microarrays. PLoS Biol. 1: E65 (http://biology.plosjournals.org/perlserv/?request=get-document&doi=10.1371/journal.pbio.0000065) 

Chen DS, Davis MM (2005) Cellular immunotherapy: Antigen recognition is just the beginning. Springer Semin Immunopathol 27:119–127

Soen Y, Chen DS, Stuge TB, Weber JS, Lee PP, et al. (2004) A novel cellular microarray identifies functional deficiences in tumor-specific T cell responses. J Clin Oncol 22:2510

Microarrays